The 1999 Vuelta a España was the 54th edition of the Vuelta a España, one of cycling's Grand Tours. The Vuelta began in Murcia, with a prologue individual time trial on 4 September, and Stage 10 occurred on 15 September with a stage to Zaragoza. The race finished in Madrid on 26 September.

Prologue
4 September 1999 — Murcia to Murcia,  (ITT)

Stage 1
5 September 1999 — Murcia to Benidorm,

Stage 2
6 September 1999 — Alicante to Albacete,

Stage 3
7 September 1999 — La Roda to Fuenlabrada,

Stage 4
8 September 1999 — Las Rozas to Salamanca,

Stage 5
9 September 1999 — Béjar to Ciudad Rodrigo,

Stage 6
10 September 1999 — Salamanca to Salamanca,  (ITT)

Stage 7
11 September 1999 — Salamanca to León,

Stage 8
12 September 1999 — León to Alto de l'Angliru,

Stage 9
13 September 1999 — Gijón to Los Corrales de Buelna,

Rest day
14 September 1999

Stage 10
15 September 1999 — Zaragoza to Zaragoza,

References

1999 Vuelta a España
Vuelta a España stages